Zuckerkandl is a surname. Notable people with the surname include:

 Berta Zuckerkandl (1864–1945), journalist, author, leader of an influential salon
 Emil Zuckerkandl (1849–1910), anatomist
 Emile Zuckerkandl (1922-2013), biologist, physiologist
 Otto Zuckerkandl (1861-1921), Austrian urologist and surgeon
 Victor Zuckerkandl (1896–1965), musicologist

Other uses
 Zuckerkandl!, a 1968 comic book
 Zuckerkandl (film), a 1969 animated film

See also 
 Organ of Zuckerkandl, para-aortic catecholamine-secreting body
 Zucker (disambiguation)
 Zuckermann